Chortoicetes is a genus of grasshoppers in the subfamily Oedipodinae and is notable for including the Australian plague locust.

Species
The Orthoptera Species File lists:
 Chortoicetes sumbaensis (Willemse, 1953) - (Sunda archipelago)
 Chortoicetes terminifera (Walker, 1870) - type species (as Chortoicetes yorketownensis Brancsik)

A number of species using this genus name, have been brought to synonymy:
 Chortoicetes acutangulus, synonym of Heteropternis thoracica
 Chortoicetes affinis, synonym of Chortoicetes terminifera
 Chortoicetes albomarginatus, synonym of Gymnobothrus lineaalba
 Chortoicetes concolor, synonym of Austroicetes frater
 Chortoicetes corallipes, synonym of Austroicetes vulgaris
 Chortoicetes elegans, synonym of Chortoicetes terminifera
 Chortoicetes fallax, synonym of Gymnobothrus cruciatus
 Chortoicetes finitima, synonym of Austroicetes frater
 Chortoicetes frater, synonym of Austroicetes frater
 Chortoicetes interruptus, synonym of Oedaleus interruptus
 Chortoicetes jungi, synonym of Austroicetes cruciata
 Chortoicetes marginalis, synonym of Pycnostictus seriatus
 Chortoicetes montana, synonym of Austroicetes frater
 Chortoicetes pusillulus, synonym of Austroicetes pusilla
 Chortoicetes romeri, synonym of Gymnobothrus roemeri
 Chortoicetes subparallelus, synonym of Gymnobothrus lineaalba
 Chortoicetes tonnoiri, synonym of Austroicetes frater
 Chortoicetes tricolor, synonym of Austroicetes tricolor
 Chortoicetes vicina, synonym of Austroicetes pusilla
 Chortoicetes vittata, synonym of Austroicetes frater
 Chortoicetes vulgaris, synonym of Austroicetes vulgaris
 Chortoicetes yorketownensis, synonym of Chortoicetes terminifera

References

External links 
 
 
 Chortoicetes at insectoid.info

Acrididae genera
Oedipodinae
Taxa named by Carl Brunner von Wattenwyl